Jalo Bhati  is a village in Kapurthala district of Punjab State, India. The village is administrated by a Sarpanch, who is an elected representative.

Demography 
According to the report published by Census India in 2011, Jalo Bhati has total number of 4 houses and population of 14 of which include 8 males and 6 females. Literacy rate of Jalo Bhati is 77.45%, higher than state average of 75.84%.  The population of children under the age of 6 years is 1 which is 7.14% of total population of Jalo Bhati, and child sex ratio is approximately  0, lower than state average of 846.

Population data

Air travel connectivity 
The closest airport to the village is Sri Guru Ram Dass Jee International Airport.

Villages in Kapurthala

References

External links
  Villages in Kapurthala
 Kapurthala Villages List

Villages in Kapurthala district